Top Pot Doughnuts is a chain of coffee and doughnut cafes started in the Capitol Hill neighborhood of Seattle, Washington.
Top Pot began in February 2002 and was started by brothers Mark and Michael Klebeck.

Locations
, Top Pot has 18 cafe locations throughout the Puget Sound region, and three in Texas, though they are only made at their downtown Seattle and Bellevue locations and shipped to other locations in the region by truck. Their recipe is used for the doughnuts sold in more than 7,000 Starbucks stores in the U.S. and Canada and also for doughnuts sold by Seattle-area grocer QFC. Top Pot Doughnuts are the official doughnut at Lumen Field, home of the Seattle Seahawks and Seattle Sounders. In 2011, Top Pot became the official doughnut and coffee of the National Lacrosse League team Washington Stealth. Starting in 2011, Top Pot Doughnuts expanded their offerings to grocery stores in Washington, Oregon, and California, including regional chain QFC.

Founding

The name "Top Pot" came from a vintage neon sign that was above a boarded-up Chinese restaurant called "Topspot". The co-founders bought the sign and while transporting it, the "S" fell off. Co-owner Mark suggested that they replace it with a coffee pot.  Top Pot Doughnuts roast their own coffee at the 5th Ave location in Seattle

Patrons
When U.S. president Barack Obama visited Seattle in October 2010, he and Senator Patty Murray stopped for doughnuts at the Top Pot on 5th Avenue in the Belltown/Denny Regrade neighborhood.

In January 2011, Seattle mayor Mike McGinn bet (among various items) a dozen Top Pot maple bars with New Orleans mayor Mitch Landrieu over the NFL NFC Wild card game.

In media

Television
Donut Paradise, Travel Channel

Books

See also
 List of doughnut shops

References

External links
 

2002 establishments in Washington (state)
Bakery cafés
Doughnut shops in the United States
Coffeehouses and cafés in the United States
Coffee in Seattle
Restaurants established in 2002
Restaurants in Seattle
Companies based in Seattle